"War" (originally entitled "War (Is Energy Enslaved)") is a 1975 song composed by Anthony Moore with lyrics by Peter Blegvad for the English avant-pop group Slapp Happy. It was recorded in November 1974 by Slapp Happy with Henry Cow for their collaborative album, Desperate Straights, but was only released in May 1975 on their second collaborative album, Henry Cow's In Praise of Learning.

Moore later rearranged "War" for his 1979 solo album, Flying Doesn't Help, crediting himself as Anthony More. The song was also covered by the Fall on their 1994 album, Middle Class Revolt, and Sol Invictus used Blegvad's lyrics for their version of "War" on their 2014 album, Once Upon A Time.

Development
After recording Slapp Happy's first album for Virgin Records, Slapp Happy (also known as Casablanca Moon) in early 1974, the band returned to the studio in May that year, and using session musicians, they recorded two new compositions Moore and Blegvad had written, "Europa" and "War (Is Energy Enslaved)". Virgin had requested a single that was "radio friendly", but upon hearing the songs they rejected them, stating that they felt they were better suited for an album. Blegvad and Moore set to work producing more music, but soon realised that the material they had written was beyond what they could handle on their own. This led to Slapp Happy asking Henry Cow to be their backing band on their second album for Virgin. After discussions between the two bands, they collaborated in November 1974 and recorded Desperate Straights as "Slapp Happy/Henry Cow".

The songs "Europa" and "War (Is Energy Enslaved)" were re-recorded for Desperate Straights, but only "Europa" was used. "War", with its contracted title, was released on their second collaborative album, In Praise of Learning (1975). "War" was always planned for Desperate Straights, and the third track of the album, "A Worm Is at Work" includes the line "a pissy myth about birth of War", which refers to the song "War". When it became clear that "War" was not going to be included on Desperate Straights, a footnote was added to the "A Worm Is at Work" lyrics in the album's liner notes stating, "The reference is to 'War (Energy Enslaved)', a Moore/Blegvad composition still in the throes of release."

"War", and the next track on In Praise of Learning, "Living in the Heart of the Beast", were later remixed by Fred Frith, Tim Hodgkinson and Martin Bisi, and were released by East Side Digital Records on the 1991 CD reissue of the album. The original mixes of "War" and "Living in the Heart of the Beast" were used on all subsequent reissues of this album.

Title
The original title of the song, "War (Is Energy Enslaved)" was taken from the line "For war is energy enslaved, but thy religion" in the poem, Vala, or The Four Zoas – Night the Ninth by William Blake. Blegvad said the song's refrain, "violence completes the partial mind" is a quote from W. B. Yeats.

Composition
In his 2019 book Henry Cow: The World Is a Problem, Benjamin Piekut described "War" as "a tightly controlled accompaniment" that Moore wrote for Blegvad's lyrics. It has a fixed eighth-note pulse with "bars of uneven meters" and a "vocal melody that hovers around the fifth scale degree" which ends each alternate line with the tonic. Piekut said Blegvad's poetry in "War" consists of "tight rhyming couplets (AA)", which change to (ABAB) in the last four lines to emphasize the closing message. His text is also full of imagery: war starts as a fetus, which becomes a "hateful baby banging its spoon against its plate", and then a woman "lead[ing] pilgrims on a destructive march in the name of peace and fame".

Writing in Beyond and Before: Progressive Rock Since the 1960s, Paul Hegarty and Martin Halliwell suggest that war in the song is created by an unnamed goddess and becomes "a necessity" in "the struggle for existence against oppression".

Personnel

Henry Cow/Slapp Happy
Dagmar Krause (credited as "Dagmar") – voice
Peter Blegvad – voice, clarinet
Anthony Moore – piano, electronics and tapework
Fred Frith – guitar
John Greaves – bass guitar
Chris Cutler – drums, radio
Additional musicians
Geoff Leigh – soprano saxophone
Mongezi Feza – trumpet

Reception
In a 1975 review of In Praise of Learning in New Musical Express, music critic Ian MacDonald described "War" as "a cauldron of boiling sound" that "heaves and thrashes like an octopus caught in a ship's ". He said Krause skillfully negotiates the "ragged obstacle course of downbeat mythologising and exploding musique concrete". In another 1975 review, Dave Laing wrote in Let It Rock that Krause's vocals on War have the same "brittle style" that American singer and songwriter Judy Collins used in "Pirate Jenny" and the Marat/Sade.

A reviewer at AllMusic described the Moore and Blegvad song as "enormous [in] proportion and power" that would not have succeeded in the hands of the "relatively quiet trio [Slapp Happy]". The Trouser Press Record Guide said Blegvad's lyrics on "War" are "mythologizing", and the music "worthy of Kurt Weill". 

Piekut called "War" a "little two-minute epic", and Krause the "star" of the show with her "clipped, almost sneering" delivery. He said the non-stop barrage of  rhyming couplets leave one breathless, making the two instrumental interludes a welcome relief. Piekut wrote that Krause's performance on the song is worthy of Mother Courage.

References

Works cited

External links
"War" lyrics. The Canterbury Website.

1975 songs
Slapp Happy songs
Henry Cow songs
War in popular culture